At the Heart of It All may refer to:

 At the Heart of It All (Aphex Twin song), an Aphex Twin track that appears on the Nine Inch Nails remix album Further Down the Spiral
 At the Heart of It All (album), an album by Capercaillie, or the title track